The Dog Iron Ranch, located about two miles east of Oologah, Oklahoma, USA, is the historic ranch and birthplace of humorist Will Rogers. It was donated to the state of Oklahoma by the Rogers family. The current property comprises  of the original 60,000 acre (240 km2) ranch operated by Clem Rogers, Will's father. Originally the ranch contained up to 10,000 Texas Longhorn cattle. The present ranch has 50 Longhorns.

History
The house was constructed in 1875 by Clem Rogers, who lived there until his wife died in 1890. His son Will was born on November 4, 1879. It is a two-story Greek Revival style building. The first floor is constructed of native oak, hickory and walnut logs. The downstairs rooms were used as a parlor and a master bedroom that also served as Clem Rogers' office. A lean-to addition comprised the kitchen, dining room and a spare bedroom. The upstairs part over the "front rooms"contained two more bedrooms.

Clem Rogers was highly influential in local politics. Thus, the house served not only as a family residence, but represented a seat of local political power. It was often called "The White House on the Verdigris."

The present barn was erected July 17, 1993 by two dozen Amish carpenters who knew the traditional notch and peg type of construction that was commonly employed in the 19th Century. However, the peak roof is covered with asphalt shingles instead of wooden shakes for greater fire safety. The original barn and possibly two replacements had been destroyed by wildfires. The current barn not only has traditional stalls, it now includes a classroom area that is also usable as an eating area.

The house where Will Rogers was born was moved about a mile in the 1960s to its present site on the ranch due to construction of nearby Lake Oologah.

On March 7, 2016, Governor Mary Fallin signed Senate Bill 1570 into law, which put the Will Rogers Memorial Commission, which governed both the Will Rogers Memorial Museum and the Dog Iron Ranch, under the control of the Oklahoma Historical Society. The new law became effective immediately.

The ranch is open to visitors daily from 8:00 AM to 5:00 PM. Admission is by voluntary contributions.

The property known as Will Rogers Ranch in Pacific Palisades was purchased by the actor in the early 1930s after Rogers moved to California. It became the Will Rogers State Historic Park (a California State Park) in 1944.

Footnotes

See also
Will Rogers Memorial

References

External links

Will Rogers Birthplace (Dog Iron Ranch)
Will Rogers Birthplace (Dog Iron Ranch) information, photos and video on TravelOK.com Official travel and tourism website for the State of Oklahoma

Ranches in Oklahoma
Houses on the National Register of Historic Places in Oklahoma
Historic house museums in Oklahoma
Museums in Rogers County, Oklahoma
Biographical museums in Oklahoma
Literary museums in the United States
Houses in Rogers County, Oklahoma
National Register of Historic Places in Rogers County, Oklahoma